Juan José Ríos is an agricultural city located in Northern Sinaloa, Mexico. It is divided in two municipalities, where its major part is located in Guasave Municipality, and the rest is in Ahome Municipality. It had a population of 27,938 inhabitants (including city's both parts in Guasave and Ahome Municipalities), according to the 2010 census.

History 
Ejido Las Vacas (formerly named Juan José Ríos), was founded on 21 September 1938 by presidential decision, by the then President Lázaro Cárdenas del Río. It had an area of 16,420 ha and 179 inhabitants; of which 64 were ejidatarios.

Between the years of 1946 and 1951 several peasants from Los Mochis, 18 de Marzo and San Miguel Zapotitlán towns, Ahome Municipality; and La Louisiana town, El Fuerte Municipality, requested to the Agricultural Department that they be granted with plots to sow in Ejido Las Vacas. And between the years of 1953 and 1954, Agricultural Department granted all of the 672 people who had requested plots.

Several towns in El Fuerte and Choix Municipalities were affected when Miguel Hidalgo Dam construction started. Its construction was divided in two phases: the first one was in the years of 1952 to 1956, and the second one in the years of 1956 to 1964.

The affected towns by dam construction in El Fuerte Municipality were: El Mahome, San Felipe, Gipago y Peñasco, Rincón de Sinaloita and Los Mezcales. The affected towns in Choix Municipality were: El Pajarito, Baca, Caballihuasa, Toro, Picachos and El Sauz. The towns which were affected, their inhabitants were located in different ejidos, as it was in Ejido Las Vacas and its nearby ejidos.

On 21 February 1955, by presidential decision, it was approved an urban area construction in Ejido Las Vacas, for all the affected people by the dam construction. On 28 February 1955, the 637 peasants who were evacuated from the 11 ejidos, which would be flooded by Fort River when the grout curtain of Miguel Hidalgo dam was closed. Affected people were given a 10 ha plot to sow and another plot for living in Ejido Las Vacas. Also, in Ejido Las Vacas were living the original 64 ejidatarios, they lived in Old Las Vacas, as they named the oldest part of Ejido Las Vacas. However, locating the 1375 ejidatarios with their families, it needed another presidential decision to locate in 500 ha each ejidatario giving them a 1,600 m2 (40 m x 40 m) plot for living, including as well as streets, schools and other public services, becoming an urban area, which one were named Juan José Ríos, and it became in a sindicatura. It was the Mexico's biggest ejido, it had an area of more than 16,400 ha.

Juan José Ríos is named after General Juan José Ríos, Mexican politician and soldier, during the Mexican Revolution. Engineers who planned the urban area construction selected this name. Also this General was the last owner of this land.

On 13 July 1989, the then Governor of Sinaloa Francisco Labastida Ochoa, made public Sinaloa State Congress approved Juan José Ríos as a city.

Sindicatura
In Sinaloa, municipalities are divided into smaller entities named sindicaturas (Spanish: sindika'tuɾas), and this one is divided into comisarías (Spanish: komisa'ɾi.as). A sindicatura male leader is named Síndico (Spanish: 'sindiko) or a female leader is named Síndica (Spanish: 'sindika). A comisaría male leader is named Comisario (Spanish: komi'saɾjo) or a female leader is named Comisaria (Spanish: komi'saɾja).

Juan José Ríos sindicatura is located in northwestern Guasave Municipality. The seat of this sindicatura is the homonymous city.

It has an area of 960.24 ha, it is 27.71% of the total area of Guasave Municipality, that is why it is the second largest sindicatura of Guasave Municipality, the biggest one is Central Sindicatura of Guasave city.

Juan José Ríos sindicatura is divided into Bachoco and Ejido Campo 38 comisarías.

Municipality 
Since a long time ago, Juan José Ríos inhabitants have requested many times of the Sinaloa Government, to create Juan José Ríos Municipality.

Juan José Ríos Municipality would be formed of:
The present Juan José Ríos sindicatura
Guasave Municipality localities:
Juan José Ríos
Bachoco
Guayparime
Ejido Héroes Mexicanos
Ejido Treinta y Ocho (Ejido Treinta y Ochito)
Campo Treinta y Ocho
Babujaqui
Poblado El Cerro Cabezón
Ahome Municipality localities:
Juan José Ríos (El Estero)
Bachoco II (El Macochín)
Ejido Cerro Cabezón (El Chorrito)
Lázaro Cárdenas (El Muellecito)
Los Batequis
La Piedrera
El Carricito
El Fuerte Municipality localities:
Ejido Tres Garantías
Agua de las Arenas
Sinaloa Municipality locality:
El Amapal

Administrative divisions 
Juan José Ríos Municipality seal would be the homonymous city, and it would be organized as:

Central Sindicatura:
Sindicatura seal: Juan José Ríos
Comisarías:
Ejido Héroes Mexicanos
Ejido Treinta y Ocho (Ejido Treinta y Ochito)
Campo Treinta y Ocho
Ejido Tres Garantías
Bachoco Sindicatura:
Sindicatura seal: Bachoco
Comisarías:
Poblado El Cerro Cabezón
Bachoco II (El Macochín)
Ejido Cerro Cabezón (El Chorrito)
Lázaro Cárdenas (El Muellecito)

Geography 
It located in Northern Sinaloa, in Fort Valley region, 20 km southwards Los Mochis, 43 km northwards Guasave and 208 km northwards Culiacán, which is Sinaloa state capital.

Its coordinate is 25°45'26 latitude north and 108°49'18 longitude west. Its altitude is 12 m above sea level.

Demographics 
It had a population of 27,938 inhabitants (including both parts of the city − Guasave and Ahome municipalities); in which 13,761 were males and 14,177 were females, according to the 2010 census.

Climate 
Its climate is generally warm and humid. The average rain precipitation is 382 millimeters annually, with July to October the rainy season.

Education

Universities 
Fort Valley Agriculture Superior School (UAS)

Schools 
Juan José Ríos UAS High School
Cobaes 11 Lic. Alejandro Ríos Espinoza High School
Conalep 117 Juan José Ríos High School

Notable people 
Antonio Osuna, baseball player
Roberto Osuna, baseball player
Ariel Barreras, singer
Pancho Barraza, singer
Miguel Martínez, actor

See also 
Guasave Municipality
Ahome Municipality
Guasave
Los Mochis
Sinaloa

References

External links
Juan José Ríos Government
Guasave Municipality
Ahome Municipality
Fort Valley Agriculture Superior School (UAS)

Sinaloa